Edward Duke may refer to:
Sir Edward Duke, 1st Baronet (c. 1604–1671), English politician
Edward Duke (antiquary) (1779–1852), English antiquary
Sir Edward Duke, 3rd Baronet (c. 1694–1732), MP for Orford

See also